The Canadian Academic English Language, or CAEL, Assessment is a standardized test designed to measure English language proficiency for admission to college and university, and for membership in professional associations. Test takers read articles, listen to a lecture, answer questions, and write a short essay, as they would be expected to do in a first-year university or college classroom.

The CAEL Assessment is accepted by over 180 academic institutions across Canada and the United States as well as to several international institutions. The test is also accepted at a number of professional organizations, including the Canadian Veterinary Association, the Royal Architectural Institute of Canada, and the Immigration Consultants of Canada Regulatory Council (ICCRC).

The CAEL Assessment is developed in Canada, by Canadians. It incorporates Canadian English and accents as used in Canadian academic contexts and post-secondary institutions. The CAEL Assessment is a fully integrated and topic-based performance test. Test takers use the information from the Reading and Listening components to write their essay.

In June 2015, Paragon Testing Enterprises, a Canadian English language testing company and a subsidiary of the University of British Columbia, acquired the CAEL Assessment from Carleton University.

History 

The CAEL Assessment was first developed by Carleton University in 1987. It was created out of a need to standardize the existing English language test given to students requiring a proficiency test as part of their admission to Carleton. However, in June 2015, Paragon Testing Enterprises, a subsidiary of The University of British Columbia (UBC), acquired the test.

Paragon currently administers three tests: the Canadian English Language Proficiency Index Program (CELPIP), the Canadian Academic English Language (CAEL) Assessment, and the Language Proficiency Index (LPI). The CELPIP Test is one of two tests designated by Immigration, Refugees and Citizenship Canada (IRCC) as proof of English language proficiency for permanent resident status in Canada and Canadian citizenship. With the acquisition of the CAEL Assessment, Paragon Testing Enterprises retired the CELPIP- Academic Test.

CAEL Test Format 

The language tasks and activities in the CAEL Assessment are systematically sampled from those that are commonly undertaken within the university academic community. The content for the tasks are drawn from introductory university courses at times when professors are introducing new topics to their students with the expectation that the students know little or nothing about the content.

Topics for the CAEL Assessment are drawn from introductory university courses such as arts, sociology, anthropology, business, engineering, sports, law, and medicine. Possible topics include criminal behaviour, global warming, urban development, cultural diversity, weather systems, team management, competition, and organizational behaviour.

The total allotted test time is approximately 145 minutes (2 hours and 25 minutes). Some test centres offer the CAEL Assessment over 2 days, with the Written Assessment and the OLT held on separate days.

The CAEL Assessment has two parts: Part 1, the Written Assessment and Part 2, the Oral Language Test (OLT).

Written Assessment

Reading 

The time allotted for the Reading section is 55 minutes. Test takers are given two readings that are on the same topic as the Listening and Writing components.

The readings are taken from the following sources:
 First-year university textbooks
 Magazine and academic journal articles
 Brochures or information leaflets
 Newspaper articles
 Graphs and charts
 Government documents
Reading tasks include:
 Identifying main ideas
 Extracting specific information
 Understanding vocabulary in context
 Classifying information
 Following a logical or chronological sequence of events

Listening 

The time allotted for the Listening section is 20 minutes. Test takers listen to a pre-recorded lecture and answer relevant questions on the same topic as the Reading and Writing components. 
 The lecture is adapted from a first-year university course.
 The recording is played only once.
 While they listen, test takers take notes and answer questions related to the lecture.
Listening tasks include:
 Identifying main ideas
 Completing charts and diagrams
 Taking notes
 Sequencing information
 Filling in the blanks
 Recording specific information

Writing 

The time allotted for the Writing section 45 minutes. Test takers will use the information from the Reading and Listening components to write a short essay. It is encouraged that test takers plan their essays prior to writing.
 The essay is always the final task of the test
 The essay topic is always provided at the beginning of the test
 The essays are typically one to two pages in length
The essay topic asks the test taker to:
 Agree or disagree with a claim
 Argue for or against a position
 Discuss advantages and disadvantages of a course of action

Oral Language Test (OLT) 

The time allotted for the Oral Language Test (OLT) is 25 minutes. The OLT is carried out on a computer equipped with a headset and microphone, however test takers will not be required to use the computer mouse or keyboard. The OLT may be taken before or after the Written Assessment.

It consists of five tasks which sample typified and recurring speech acts within college and university settings:

Scoring 
CAEL Assessment Scores are reported for Listening, Reading, Writing, and Speaking test components. The scores range from band level 10 to band level 90.

CAEL Band Descriptors 

Each band score corresponds to a descriptive statement summarizing the level of English language proficiency of a test taker.

Interpretation of Band Scores

Results 
Results of tests taken at Canadian test centres are available within 8 business days after the scheduled test date. However, the results of tests taken at international test locations are available within 20 business days after the scheduled test date.

Test takers’ test scores can be sent to five institutions, which is included in the registration fee. Institution details are provided by the test takers when registering online, or up to 4 days before the chosen test date. The official score reports will only be mailed to academic and professional institutions.

Test Centre Locations and Test Dates 
Test takers can currently take the CAEL Assessment at test centres across Canada and China.

To see the full list of test centres and their corresponding test dates, please visit the CAEL website: https://www.cael.ca/

Institutions that Accept CAEL 
The CAEL Assessment is accepted by over 180 academic institutions across Canada and internationally as proof of English proficiency. A number of professional associations also recognize the CAEL Assessment as proof of English language proficiency required for membership.

*This institution accepts the CAEL Assessment but it is not recognized as an official English language proficiency test on their website.

Other English Language Proficiency Tests 
Many post-secondary institutions in Canada and the United States of America require proof of English language proficiency as one of their admission requirements. The most common English language proficiency tests other than the CAEL Assessment include: the International English Language Testing System (IELTS), Test of English as a Foreign Language (TOEFL), the Michigan English Language Assessment Battery (MELAB), Test of English for International Communication (TOEIC), the Pearson Test of English Academic (PTE Academic), and more.

See also 
 English Language Proficiency
 Immigration Consultants of Canada Regulatory Council (ICCRC)
 List of Admission Tests to Colleges and Universities
 Canadian English Language Proficiency Index Program (CELPIP)
 International English Language Testing System (IELTS)
 Test of English as a Foreign Language (TOEFL)
 Michigan English Language Assessment Battery (MELAB)
 Test of English for International Communication (TOEIC)
 Pearson Test of English Academic (PTE Academic)

References

External links 
 CAEL Website
 CAEL Facebook Page
 Paragon Testing Enterprises Website

English language tests